Nelson Rodrigo Parraguez Riveros (born April 5, 1971) is a retired Chilean football midfielder who was capped 52 times for the Chile national team between 1991 and 2001, including three games at the 1998 FIFA World Cup.

Paraguez played most of his career for Universidad Católica where he won one league title and two Copa Chile.

He also played abroad for Necaxa of Mexico and Nueva Chicago of Argentina.

Honours

Club
Universidad Católica
 Copa Interamericana (1): 1994
 Primera División de Chile (1): 1997 Apertura
 Copa Chile (2): 1991, 1995

International
Chile
  (1):

References

External links

 Universidad Católica profile

1971 births
Living people
Footballers from Santiago
Chilean footballers
Chile international footballers
Club Deportivo Universidad Católica footballers
Club Necaxa footballers
Nueva Chicago footballers
Chilean Primera División players
Liga MX players
Argentine Primera División players
Chilean expatriate sportspeople in Mexico
Chilean expatriate sportspeople in Argentina
Expatriate footballers in Mexico
Expatriate footballers in Argentina
1998 FIFA World Cup players
1991 Copa América players
1993 Copa América players
1995 Copa América players
1997 Copa América players
1999 Copa América players
Association football midfielders